Sergey Georgiev (Bulgarian: Сергей Георгиев; born 15 May 1992) is a Bulgarian professional footballer who currently plays as a winger.

Career

Youth career
Georgiev began his football career with Levski Sofia, but joined Elit Sofia as an 8-year-old in 2000. He left Elit for Spanish side CD Canillas at the age of 17 in 2009.

PFC Bansko
On 23 March 2012 Sergey joined the Bulgarian B Group side team Bansko.

PFC Montana
In June 2014 Georgiev moved from Bansko to the other B Group team PFC Montana.
On 25 September 2014, he scored the winning goal during extra time in PFC Montana's surprising 2:1 victory over CSKA Sofia in the 1/16 finals of the Bulgarian Cup. On 4 June 2016 he scored a goal and assisted for another one in 2-1 win against OFC Pomorie in the Relegation play-off.

Career statistics

Club

References

External links

1992 births
Living people
Bulgarian footballers
First Professional Football League (Bulgaria) players
FC Bansko players
FC Montana players
FC Tsarsko Selo Sofia players
Association football midfielders
CD Canillas players